The Peel Sessions was the 1986 album release of the sessions The Ruts recorded in May 1979 for Radio 1's John Peel Show. Although released as a 12 inch vinyl platter the record was designed to be played at (the same) 45 rpm (as a 7 inch single). [tmi.]

Track listing
 "SUS"
 "Society"
 "You're Just A..."
 "It Was Cold"
 "Something That I Said"

References

The Ruts albums
Ruts, The
Albums produced by Tony Wilson
1986 live albums
1986 compilation albums